Jaime Zea (born in Huyro, La Convención, Cuzco, 17 February 1960) was the mayor of Villa El Salvador, one of the most populated districts of Lima, Peru. He began his mayoral term in 2003 and was reelected in 2007.

References

1960 births
Living people
Mayors of places in Peru